Gotham: A History of New York City to 1898 is a non-fiction book by historians Edwin G. Burrows and Mike Wallace. Based on over twenty years of research, it was published in 1998 by Oxford University Press and won the 1999 Pulitzer Prize for History, and detailed the history of the city before the consolidation of the five boroughs in 1898. A follow-up volume, Greater Gotham: A History of New York City from 1898 to 1919, written by Wallace, was published in 2017 and covered New York City history for the following 20 years. Initial plans were to have the second volume's timeline go through World War II, but due to the amount of material, an upcoming third volume should cover the period from 1920 until 1945.

Reception
In his review for The Atlantic, Timothy J. Gilfoyle called the book "the most comprehensive examination to date of the city's history prior to 1900," saying that "Gotham may rank in importance with the multi-volume works on Thomas Jefferson by Dumas Malone and on the Civil War by Allan Nevins," while Clyde Haberman in The New York Times wrote that "Burrows and Wallace offer a large-canvas portrait of a city they clearly love. . . . [I]t marches relentlessly across the nearly three centuries from the Dutch landing to the emergence of the unified boroughs. The countless topics include, to list but a few, New York's wars with the Indians and its pro-Crown leanings, its financial support for the slave trade and its bloody draft riots during the Civil War, the commercial imperatives and the waves of immigration that constantly redefined it." Publishers Weekly called the work "definitive."

Naming
"Gotham" as a term for New York City was coined by Washington Irving in an 1807 November issue of his literary magazine, Salmagundi, based on the legends of the English village of Gotham, whose inhabitants are known for their folly.

References

1998 non-fiction books
20th-century history books
History of New York City
Pulitzer Prize for History-winning works
History books about the United States
Books about New York City
Oxford University Press books
Collaborative non-fiction books